Median sternotomy is a type of surgical procedure in which a vertical inline incision is made along the sternum, after which the sternum itself is divided using a sternal saw. This procedure provides access to the heart and lungs for surgical procedures such as heart transplant, lung transplant, corrective surgery for congenital heart defects, or coronary artery bypass surgery.

References

Thoracic surgical procedures
Surgical incisions